Allotinus bidiensis is a butterfly in the family Lycaenidae. It was described by John Nevill Eliot in 1986. It is found on Borneo.

References

Butterflies described in 1986
Allotinus
Butterflies of Borneo